Lifeline is the second album by the California soft rock group Pablo Cruise. Released in 1976, the album reached No. 139 on the Billboard Top LPs chart in the United States. In 1977, Barbra Streisand recorded "Don't Believe It" with mostly different lyrics for her album Superman.

Track listing

Side One
"Crystal" (Jenkins, Lerios) - 3:42 (lead singer: Bud Cockrell)
"Don't Believe It" (Ron Nagle) - 3:15 (lead singer: David Jenkins)
"Tearin' Down My Mind" (Eugene Autry) - 3:58 (lead singer: Bud Cockrell)
"(I Think) It's Finally Over" (Jenkins, Lerios) - 3:13 (lead singers: David Jenkins, Bud Cockrell)
"Lifeline" (Ron Nagle) - 3:36 (lead singers: David Jenkins, Bud Cockrell)

Side Two
"Zero to Sixty in Five" (Jenkins, Lerios) - 5:01 (instrumental)
"Look to the Sky" (Cockrell) - 3:03 (lead singer: Bud Cockrell)
"Never See That Girl Enough" (Jenkins) - 3:28 (lead singer: David Jenkins)
"Who Knows" (Cockrell) - 3:38 (lead singer: Bud Cockrell)
"Good Ship Pablo Cruise" (Jenkins, Lerios, Price) - 3:28 (lead singer: David Jenkins)

Personnel
David Jenkins - guitars, harmonica, vocals, bass on "Who Knows"
Steve Price - percussion, drums
Bud Cockrell - bass, vocals
Cory Lerios - piano, keyboards, synthesizer, backing vocals
Geoffrey Palmer, Steve Frediani - saxophone
Andrew Gold - electric guitar, backing vocals, tambourine on "Lifeline"
Don Francisco, Venetta Fields - backing vocals
Dan Levitt - guitar harmonies on "Zero to Sixty in Five"
Dan Dugmore - pedal steel guitar on "Look to the Sky"
David Campbell - strings and horn arrangements on "Zero to Sixty in Five"

Production
Val Garay - producer, engineer
Greg Ladanyi, Steve Maslow - assistant engineers 
Doug Sax - mastering
Norman Seeff - photography
Roland Young - art direction
Junie Osaki - design

References

Pablo Cruise albums
1976 albums
Albums produced by Val Garay
A&M Records albums